The January 1997 flood of the Merced River (flooded/flooded from the watershed/floodplain of the Merced River) occurred from December 31, 1996, to January 5, 1997, throughout the Yosemite Valley in Yosemite National Park, Mariposa County, California, US.  The flood stands as arguably the park's worst natural disaster to date (some would give this designation to the rockfall of 1996 or the Rim Fire of 2013), and inarguably the worst flood in park history. The Merced River at Happy Isles peaked at 10,100 cubic feet per second during the flood. A book was written on the flood later in 1997 by Mark Goodin titled Yosemite: The 100-Year Flood.

Beginnings
Thoughts about flooding at the end of 1996 would likely have been directed toward a May 1996 flood that had been, at the time, the fifth worst flood in park history.  The 1997 flood would soon bump this flood down to sixth on the list.

The last week in 1996, an unusually warm rain began to fall on the snow-packed mountains above Sacramento. The snow then began melting during a torrential 24-hour rainfall on January 1–2, 1997.  The rain and melted snow overflowed small creeks and eventually the large Merced River, which flows through Yosemite Valley.

Although nearly simultaneous flooding of the Tuolumne River, also originating in Yosemite National Park, did little damage within the park, it did major damage downstream in the City of Modesto.

Effects
The flooding stranded 2,100 visitors in the park.  Stranded New Years' vacationers were finally able to begin leaving Yosemite Valley on January 3, as the worst of the flooding was over, though the drive out of the park still saw many cars partially submerged in water.

All roads out of the park—Highway 120, Highway 41, and Highway 140—were inundated by the floodwaters.

Though there were luckily no human fatalities, Yosemite Valley suffered many damages.  Trails and bridges were badly damaged, and about half of all accommodations were destroyed.  Yosemite Lodge, which has its hotel rooms in separate individual buildings, had 189 cabins and 108 hotel rooms badly damaged or destroyed in the flooding, drastically depleting the hotel's capacity.  Half of all campsites were destroyed.  Trash cans, picnic tables, bearproof storage boxes, and fire grates floated down the river.

The estimated cost of rebuilding the Upper Pines, Lower Pines, and North Pines and removing the damaged Upper and Lower River campgrounds was over $8 million. Total park damages were estimated at $178 million.

Highway 120 west out of the park was inundated in many areas and closed for nearly half a year for repairs.

Damage assessment was delayed considerably due to a cold front and subsequent snowstorm that brought frozen precipitation back to the Valley on January 5.

Other areas affected
Other towns affected by the floods included:
 El Portal
 Foresta
 Wawona

Top five Yosemite floods

Suggested reading
 Yosemite: The 100-Year Flood by Mark Goodin

See also
 1996 Yosemite Valley Landslide
 Yosemite Lodge at the Falls
 Yosemite National Park

References

Flood
1997
Yosemite National Park
History of Mariposa County, California
History of the Sierra Nevada (United States)
1997 in California
1997 floods in the United States